Autonomous State Demand Committee (ASDC), originally Peoples Democratic Front, was set up as a mass organization of the Communist Party of India (Marxist-Leninist) Liberation with the aim of statehood for the Karbi Anglong region in the India state of Assam.

ASDC was active in the districts of Karbi Anglong and Dima Hasao (North Chachar Hills). Several elections to the Lok Sabha and the District Council were won under ASDC banner. Dr. Jayanta Rongpi represented the area in the Lok Sabha, elected as the ASDC candidate in 1991, 1996 and 1998. Later, ASDC split into two, with one section the Autonomous State Demand Committee (United) breaking away from CPI(ML) Liberation and aligning with the Bharatiya Janata Party. 

The main group loyal to CPI(ML) Liberation reorganized themselves as Autonomous State Demand Committee (Progressive). From 1999 election onwards, Autonomous State Demand Committee (Progressive) candidates contest election on the banner of Communist Party of India (Marxist-Leninist) Liberation.

See also
CPI(ML) Liberation
Indian People's Front
Lal Sena

References 

now the new party for Autonomous State demand committee was emerged as HSDC
Communist Party of India (Marxist–Leninist) Liberation
Defunct political parties in Assam
Karbi Anglong district
Year of establishment missing